Faustino Tasso, also called Il Somerso (1541–1575) was an Italian monk and poet.

He was born in the Republic of Venice, and was putatively a Franciscan theologian. He wrote two books of poetry titled Rime Toscane published in Turin.

Notes

1541 births
1575 deaths
16th-century Italian poets
16th-century male writers
Italian male poets
Writers from Venice